The dodecaborate(12) anion, [B12H12]2−, is a borane with an icosahedral arrangement of 12 boron atoms, with each boron atom being attached to a hydrogen atom. Its symmetry is classified by the molecular point group Ih.

Synthesis and reactions
The existence of the dodecaborate(12) anion, [B12H12]2−, was predicted by H. C. Longuet-Higgins and M. de V. Roberts in 1955. Hawthorne and Pitochelli first made it 5 years later, by the reaction of 2-iododecaborane with triethylamine in benzene solution at 80 °C. It is more conveniently prepared in two steps from sodium borohydride. First the borohydride is converted into a triborate anion using the etherate of boron trifluoride:
 5 NaBH4 + BF3 → 2 NaB3H8 + 3 NaF + 2 H2 
Pyrolysis of the triborate gives the twelve-boron cluster as the sodium salt. A variety of other synthetic methods have been published.

Salts of the dodecaborate ion are stable in air and do not react with hot aqueous sodium hydroxide or hydrochloric acid. The anion can be electrochemically oxidised to [B24H23]3−.

Substituted derivatives
Salts of  undergo hydroxylation with hydrogen peroxide to give salts of [B12(OH)12]2−. The hydrogen atoms in the ion [B12H12]2− can be replaced by the halogens with various degrees of substitution. The following numbering scheme is used to identify the products. The first boron atom is numbered 1, then the closest ring of five atoms around it is numbered anticlockwise from 2 to 6. The next ring of boron atoms is started from 7 for the atoms closest to number 2 and 3, and counts anticlockwise to 11. The atom opposite the original is numbered 12. A related derivative is [B12(CH3)12]2−. The icosahedron of boron atoms is aromatic in nature.

Under kilobar pressure of carbon monoxide [B12H12]2− reacts to form the carbonyl derivatives [B12H11CO]− and the  1,12- and 1,7-isomers of B12H10(CO)2. The para disubstitution at the 1,12 is unusual. In water the dicarbonyls appear to form carboxylic ions: [B12H10(CO)CO2H]− and [B12H10(CO2H)2]2−.

Potential applications 
Compounds based on the ion [B12H12]2−  have been evaluated for solvent extraction of the radioactive ions 152Eu3+ and 241Am3+.

[B12H12]2−,  [B12(OH)12]2− and [B12(OMe)12]2− show promise for use in drug delivery. They form "closomers", which have been used to make nontargeted high-performance MRI contrast agents which are persistent in tumor tissue.

Salts of [B12H12]2− are potential therapeutic agents in cancer treatment. For applications in boron neutron capture therapy, derivatives of closo-dodecaborate increase the specificity of neutron irradiation treatment. Neutron irradiation causes boron-10 to emit an alpha particle near the tumor.

References 

Boranes
Anions
Substances discovered in the 1960s